William Henry de Rockstro Malraison (4 December 1876 – 31 May 1916) was a South African first-class cricketer and South African Army soldier.

Malraison was born at Wepener in the Orange Free State in December 1876 to Bernard de Rockstro Malraison and his wife, Annie Georgina. Malraison is recorded as standing as umpire in two first-class matches in 1895 in the Currie Cup, however given he would have been 18 years of age at the time these matches were played, it is plausible this was instead his father who stood in these matches, given he was a well known scorer and had previously umpired minor matches in South Africa. Malraison later made two appearances in first-class cricket for Transvaal in 1904 in the Currie Cup against Natal at Durban and Griqualand West at Johannesburg. He scored 41 runs across his two matches, with a highest score of 28. Malraison fought in the First World War with the South African Army, holding the rank of corporal in the 1st South African Horse. He died on 31 May 1916 from fever while serving in German East Africa. He was buried at the Dar es Salaam Cemetery.

References

External links

1876 births
1916 deaths
People from Wepener
South African cricket umpires
South African cricketers
Gauteng cricketers
South African military personnel of World War I
South African military personnel killed in World War I
South African Army personnel